Carlos Moisés Lara Bejarano (April 19, 1924 in Pelileo – July 13, 2006 in Portoviejo) was an Ecuadorian radiotelegraphist and bureaucrat.

Bio
Born at Pelileo, he emigrated at early age to Ibarra with his father only, because his mother died when he was a kid.

He studied in Ibarra until the High School, and when he was 17 he emigrated to Portoviejo, where he began to work at the Ecuadorian Telegraph National Direction.  In the capital of Manabí, he known his future wife Mercedes Murillo Loor, native of Jipijapa.  They married at June 6, 1942 and procreated 12 children.

Radiotelegraphist career
In 1958 the Ecuadorian Telephone and Telegraph Company was created by the union of Telegraph Direction and International Radio of Ecuador, because the government wanted that both companies don't fall in monopoly issues.  In that circumstances al 1960 the president Camilo Ponce Enríquez designated him as the National Director of both companies.  He was in office until 1963 when he was deposed by the dictatorship of the Military Junta.

Other offices
After his labor as radiotelegraphist, he worked at the telecommunications area of the National Development Bank, with his vast experience in that.  Also, he worked at Ecuadorian Institute of Social Security and in the General Contralory of the State, where he retired at 1992

Death
He died in Portoviejo of cancer on July 13, 2006.

References

1920s births
2006 deaths
Communications in Ecuador
People from Tungurahua Province